Solberg–Hunterdon Airport , also known as Solberg Airport, is located in Readington Township, New Jersey, United States.

History
Founded in 1941 by Norwegian-born and -raised aviation pioneer Thor Solberg, Solberg Airport is a small general aviation airport located in central New Jersey. In 1985 Solberg was inducted into the New Jersey Aviation Hall of Fame. He is also considered a major aviation pioneer in his native country. Norway's oldest airport, Jarlsberg, is dedicated to his memory, and today operates as a major general aviation airport and parachute center near the ancient city of Tønsberg in southeastern Norway.

Solberg's son and namesake, Thor Solberg Jr., died on December 16, 2017. The airport is currently run by two generations of Thor Solberg's heirs. His children, Lorraine Solberg and Suzy Solberg Nagle, maintain day-to-day operations with the help of four grandchildren.

Facilities and aircraft
Solberg Airport is situated on 725 wide open acres in Readington, and contains two runways. The primary runway is 4/22, measuring 3,735 x 50 ft (1,138 x 15 m). 3,000 ft (914 m) of this runway is paved with asphalt, and 735 ft (224 m) is turf reserved as a displaced threshold. The second runway, 13/31, is turf measuring 3,442 x 200 ft (1,049 x 61 m).

For the 12-month period ending September 3, 2011, the airport had 21,486 aircraft operations, an average of 59 per day: 65% local general aviation and 35% transient general aviation. At that time there were 97 aircraft based at this airport: 82% single-engine, 9% multi-engine, 6% jet aircraft, and 2% helicopters.

Balloon festival
The Quick Chek New Jersey Festival of Ballooning celebrated its 25th anniversary in 2007. That year, the event was the largest summertime hot air balloon festival in North America, and was run by Howard Freidman and Sally Mazzochi.

Presidential temporary flight restrictions 
Solberg Airport is within a 10-mile radius of the Trump National Golf Club in Bedminster, New Jersey. During the former presidency of Donald Trump, the airport was subject to FAA flight restrictions whenever Trump was in Bedminster.

References

External links 
 

Airports in New Jersey
Transportation buildings and structures in Hunterdon County, New Jersey